Gillis is a male given name. Notable people with the name are as follows:

Gillis Ahlberg (1892–1930), Swedish rower
Gillis Backereel (1572–1662), Flemish painter 
Gillis Berthout (1175/80–1241), Dutch nobleman
Gillis Bildt (1820–1894), Swedish politician
Gillis Claeissens (1526–1605), Flemish painter 
Gillis Coignet (c. 1542 – 1599), Flemish painter
Gillis II Coignet (1586–1641), Flemish painter 
Gillis van Coninxloo (1544–1607), Flemish painter
Gillis d'Hondecoeter ((c. 1575-1580–1638), Dutch painter
Gillis Hooftman (1521–1581), Dutch merchant
Gillis Grafström (1893–1938), Swedish figure skater
Gillis Lundgren (1929–2016), Swedish furniture designer 
Gillis Mostaert (1528–1598), Flemish painter 
Gillis Neyts (1618 or 1623–1678), Flemish painter
Gillis Schagen (1616–1668), Dutch painter
Gillis van Tilborgh (c. 1625 – c. 1678), Flemish painter
Gillis Valckenier (1623–1680), Dutch politician
Gillis Wilson (born 1977), American football player

Swedish masculine given names
Dutch masculine given names